WPTG-CD (channel 69) is a low-power television station in Pittsburgh, Pennsylvania, United States, affiliated with This TV. It is owned by Fifth Street Enterprises, LLC. WPTG-CD's transmitter is located in Pittsburgh's Oakland neighborhood.

History
The station's construction permit was issued on October 31, 1988 under the calls of W69CC. On February 6, 2002, it was changed to WPTG-LP. On December 23, 2013, it was changed to WPTG-LD. The current callsign of WPTG-CD was assigned on April 25, 2014.

WPTG-CD was owned by Abacus Television until it was sold, along with four other TV stations, to Fifth Street Enterprises in April 2015.

Technical information

Subchannels
The station's digital signal is multiplexed:

References

External links

Television stations in Pittsburgh
Low-power television stations in the United States
This TV affiliates
GetTV affiliates
Retro TV affiliates
NewsNet affiliates
True Crime Network affiliates
Heartland (TV network) affiliates